Café de Flore is a Canadian drama film, released in 2011. Directed, written, and edited by Jean-Marc Vallée, the film garnered 13 nominations for the 2012 Genie Awards. The film's title refers not to the café on Boulevard Saint-Germain in Paris, but to a Matthew Herbert song of the same name which the film uses to represent its musical current.

Plot
The film cuts between two seemingly unrelated stories. One, set in present-day Montreal, focuses on Antoine, a successful club DJ torn between his new girlfriend Rose and his still-complicated relationship with his childhood friend and ex-wife Carole; the other, set in 1960s Paris, features Jacqueline, the fiercely protective single mother of Laurent, a child with Down syndrome who has a crush on Véronique, a friend and companion who also has Down syndrome.

The film builds toward the revelation of how the two stories are linked: after Jacqueline, Laurent, and Véronique are killed in a car accident, Carole, Antoine, and Rose are their subsequent reincarnations.

Cast

A small (last credit on screen) but important role is "la médium", played by Emmanuelle Beaugrand-Champagne. She helps Carole understand that her recurring dreams of a young mongoloid (word used in the dialogue) boy, and of a horrendous car crash, are the memories from when she was Jacqueline, going through her own emotional trauma that her love for Laurent (Carole for Antoine) was being displaced by his love for Véronique (Rose).

Production

Filming
Café de Flore was shot in Montréal and Paris, from 16 August 2010 until 19 November 2010. In Paris, a scene was filmed on the Boulevard Saint-Germain in front of the actual Café de Flore.

Soundtrack
Café de Flore multi-genre soundtrack includes songs from the Cure, Sigur Ros, Creedence Clearwater Revival and Pink Floyd. By fusing modern electronic and avant-garde elements with old world orchestral sounds, the music connects the two major time periods of the film.

The film borrows its title from the electronic-tinged "Café de Flore", a song written and performed by British musician Matthew Herbert in 2000. The song is used throughout the film to represent and reinforce its central themes.

Café de Flore features two a capella performances: an a capella rendition of the Cure's "Just Like Heaven" performed by Florent and Parent, and a cover of Herbert's "Café de Flore" performed by Paradis, Brochu and Les Petits Chanteurs du Mont Royal.

Vallée had originally planned to put Led Zeppelin's "Stairway to Heaven" on the soundtrack, but lead singer Robert Plant turned down its use.

Reception

Critical response 

In Canada, Café de Flore was generally well received by critics. CineAction critic Alsegul Koc describes Valleé's film as "the aftershocks of an amorous earthquake"; a story which "amplifies the horrors and joys of letting go and starting anew". He admires the film's ability to delve into deeper, more emotionally vulnerable areas of the human psyche than conventional love stories. The Globe and Mail critic Guy Dixon gives the film 3.5 out of 4 stars, describing it as "beautiful" and "intricate", and applauds the performance of Florent, who, in his view, played a large role in weaving the two story lines together. Mary Corliss, writing for Time magazine, echoes praise for Florent's as well as Paradis' performance, calling them "luminous". She also acclaims Vallée's offbeat cinematic style, nothing that although "the viewer will have to leap with Vallée, his film is so sure-footed, emotionally and cinematically, that that risky step seems like walking on air in a beautiful dream". Jay Stone from Postmedia News gives the film four out of five stars, noting Vallée's ability to use music to craft a story of unfailing love. He calls the Montréal filmmaker a "visual storyteller" who "creates montages linked by their emotional colours".

While Café de Flore was generally well recognized by the Canadian film community, the film obtained mediocre reviews and low turnouts in France. The film, which attracted a promising 45 critics upon its initial theatrical début, ultimately grossed fewer than 85,000 total viewings. In a Téléjournal broadcast, Claude Fugère sums up the general opinion of Télérama critics, who called the film a "vaguely esoteric melodrama chock-full of clichés on life, love and death ... a disappointment from the director of the excellent C.R.A.Z.Y.. In a similar tone, Hubert Lizé, writing for Le Parisien, gives the film one out of five stars, calling Vallée's work "overly ambitious" and his character development "tiresome" and "frustrating". Danielle Attali, writing for Le Journal du Dimanche, gives the film the same rating, calling the plot "convoluted" and "frustrating". In a mixed review, Le Monde critic praises Paradis' performance but notes that "for her [Paradis'] sake, we should be irritated by the film's far-fetched concoction of a dual story line ... a far cry from being 'mysterious' or 'mystical'." In contrast to other Parisian reviewers, Mathieu Carratier from Première gives the film 3.75/4 stars, praising Vallée music selection by comparing him to a "DJ who mixes different paths together to better grasp the stories which they tell".

Critic Ginette Vincendeau gives Café de Flore a mixed review, noting that within the film, "there are convincing and emotionally potent moments ... the film is at its best on this register of intimate realism" but that "it is less good when grandstanding on cliché concepts such as the 'perfect soulmate', or the more excessive manifestations of love, maternal or romantic". The Sight & Sound critic concludes her review by stating that though the film attempts to connect two stories in different time periods, the "convoluted leaps in time and space often make the film difficult to follow, and in danger of appearing pretentious rather than sophisticated". The Guardian Mike McCahill rates the film one out of five stars, calling Vallée's film a "narcissistic", "fundamentally unpersuasive", "head-in-the-clouds" drama with a revelation that may "prove to be the most stupid love twist of the decade".

American reviews were also mixed. Charles Cassady, a reviewer from Video Librarian, gives the film three out of three stars, uplifting its "bittersweet mise-en-scène, which thankfully never tips into horror/suspense or becomes carried away with f/x, instead offering a mature and wise (if a little male wish-fulfillment-tinged) take on themes of 'soulmates' and the limitations of love". Variety's Boyd van Hoeij salutes the film's casting, but deems Café de Flore unoriginal, noting that "Vallée has taken what made C.R.A.Z.Y so successful, and simply tried to replicate it on a slightly larger scale. [Occasionally] similarities between the films ... are so striking it almost feels like Vallée's ripping himself off".

Accolades
The film garnered the most nominations (13) at the 32nd Genie Awards:
Best Picture (Vallée, Poulin & Even)
Best Actress in a Leading Role (Paradis)
Best Actor in a Supporting Role (Gerrier)
Best Actress in a Supporting Role (Florent)
Best Director (Vallée)
Best Original Screenplay (Vallée)
Best Art Direction (Vermette)
Best Cinematography (Pierre Cottereau)
Best Costume Design (Magny & Youchnovski)
Best Overall Sound (Minondo, Caron, Fernandes & Gignac)
Best Sound Editing (Pinsonnault, Blanchier, Meilleur, Morin & Raymond)
Best Achievement in Make-up (Fattori & Marin)
Best Achievement in Visual Effects (Dudouet, Morou, Normandin, Pensa, Cote, Broussard, Theroux, Sansfacon, Tremblay & Chuntz)

Of those nominations, the film won three Genie Awards: Best Actress (Paradis), Achievement in Make-Up (Fattori & Marin) and Achievement in Visual Effects. Café de Flore also won two Prix Iris: Best Actress (Paradis) and Cinematography and Art Direction (Cottereau).

At the 12th Annual Vancouver Film Critics Circle Awards, Café de Flore won Best Canadian Film. Paradis and Florent were also nominated for Best Actress in a Canadian Film and Best Supporting Actress in a Canadian Film, respectively.

References

External links

 
 Café de Flore at AlloCiné
 Café de Flore at Metacritic
 Café de Flore at AllMovie

2011 films
2011 drama films
Canadian drama films
2000s English-language films
2000s French-language films
Films directed by Jean-Marc Vallée
Films about divorce
Films about families
Films about reincarnation
Films about disability
Films set in Montreal
Films set in Paris
Films set in the 1960s
Down syndrome in film
Films scored by Matthew Herbert
French-language Canadian films
2010s Canadian films
2000s Canadian films